"Love & Pride" is the debut single by Coventry band King, produced by Richard James Burgess and featured on the band's first studio album Steps in Time.

The single was first released in April 1984 but was not a success, spending only three weeks on the UK Singles Chart and reaching a lowly No. 84. However, after the group performed the song on Saturday morning television at the end of 1984, CBS Records re-released it and it became a big hit. "Love & Pride" hit No. 2 on the UK chart in February 1985, remaining there for three consecutive weeks and only being held from the top spot by "I Know Him So Well", the duet by Elaine Paige and Barbara Dickson.

The single failed to duplicate this success in the US, where it stalled at No. 55 on the Billboard Hot 100. It was more popular in clubs, where two separate 12" remixes propelled it to No. 17 on the Billboard Dance Club Songs chart. The single features a Prophet 5 synthesizer.

British electronic band Cicada sampled portions of "Love & Pride" on their song "Woh" off their 2011 album Sunburst.

Track listings
7" CBS Records / A 4988 (UK)
A   "Love & Pride" – 3:20
B   "Don't Stop" – 4:15 

2 x 7" (Double Pack) CBS Records / DA 4988 (UK)
A1   "Love & Pride" – 3:20
A2   "Don't Stop" – 4:15
B1   "Love & Pride" (Live Version)
B2   "I Kissed the Spikey Fridge" (Live Version) 

12" CBS Records / TX 4988 (UK)
A1   "Love & Pride" (Body & Soul Mix) – 5:27
B1   "Don't Stop" (Edit) – 3:38
B2   "Classic Strangers" – 3:32 

12" Epic / 49 05236 (US)
A   "Love & Pride" (Extended Mix) – 6:14
B   "Love & Pride" (Dub Mix) – 4:05

Chart performance

Weekly charts

Year-end charts

References

1984 debut singles
1984 songs
CBS Records singles
Song recordings produced by Richard James Burgess
King (band) songs